Geoffrey John Atherden , credited also as Geoff Atherden, is an Australian television screenwriter and playwright, especially of comedy. He is best known for creating the sitcom Mother and Son.

Early life and education
Atherden attended the University of Sydney in the 1960s. He trained as an architect.

Architectural career
Atherden practised as an architect until he was in his mid-thirties. He worked for the architectural firm of McConnel Smith & Johnson, and was responsible for designing the Law Courts building in Queen's Square, Sydney.

Writing career
In 1969, the founders of Producers Authors Composers and Talent (now PACT Centre for Emerging Artists) attended a Sydney University Architecture Revue, with sets by Atherden and Grahame Bond, and invited Bond, Atherden, Peter Weir and his friend, composer Peter Best, a chance to do a show at the National Art School's Cellblock Theatre. Sir Robert Helpmann saw the show and  took it to the Adelaide Festival, and soon afterwards Weir and Bond were commissioned to write a Christmas special TV show for ABC Television, called Man on a Green Bike. Atherden was later a contributor to The Aunty Jack Show, which starred Bond. He was script editor on a four-part sketch series, Jokes, which ran on ABC-TV in early 1979. In the middle of the same year he scripted a seven-part comedy, One-Day Miller.<ref>Mark Lawrence, One-Day Miller" a one-day wonder", Melbourne Age Green Guide section, 2 August 1979 p. 4</ref> In 1981 he was writer on the series Ratbags (1981) and the soap opera Sons and Daughters the following year.

In 1976, Atherden designed sets for the rock opera Hero, produced by Bond.

Atherden has written a number of plays. Prior to working in television he wrote Balloon Dubloon – the revue in 1965 and theatre show in 1970. He then concentrated on screenwriting, but continuing in writing for theatre again from 1994 onwards, including Hotspur (1994) and Black Cockatoo (2020).

He is perhaps best known for creating and writing the sitcom Mother and Son, which ran for over 10 years (January 1984 to March 1994). Other work includes the comedy-drama Grass Roots and the mockumentary BabaKiueria.

Other roles
Atherden served as the president of Australian Writers' Guild and Australian Writers' Foundation. In 2016, Atherden joined the Screenrights Board, which licenses secondary users of broadcast content, along with other secondary functions.

He has also served two terms on the board of Screen NSW.

 Recognition and awards 
Atherden was appointed a Member of the Order of Australia on 26 January 2009, "For service to the television industry as a scriptwriter, and to the advancement of writers for performance through executive roles with professional organisations.".Mother and Son'' won several awards.

Television scripts

Selected theatre

References

External links 

Geoffrey Atherden at Australian Screen

Living people
Year of birth missing (living people)
Australian television writers
Australian comedy writers
Members of the Order of Australia
Australian dramatists and playwrights
Australian male television writers